Slice is a 2018 American horror comedy film, written and directed by Austin Vesely. The film stars Zazie Beetz and Chance Bennett, with Rae Gray, Marilyn Dodds Frank, Katherine Cunningham, Will Brill, Y'lan Noel, Hannibal Buress, Tim Decker, Joe Keery, Chris Parnell, and Paul Scheer appearing in supporting roles. It follows the murders of several pizza deliverymen in the Ghost Town neighborhood of Kingfisher, and various townspeople's efforts to solve the crimes.

It was theatrically released on September 10, 2018, by A24.

Plot

Perfect Pizza Place deliveryman Sean Hammerschmidt has his throat slit while making a delivery at the Ghost Town area, where the town's 40,000 ghost citizens reside.

Kingfisher Chronicle reporter Sadie Sheridan attends Mayor Tracy's press conference regarding Sean's murder. Mayor Tracy is interrupted by shouting from Debbie, a local activist and member of the group Justice 40,000, which seeks to demolish the Halcyon Square on which Perfect Pizza is located. Group leader Vera Marcus later leads a protest outside of Perfect Pizza. Detective Steve Marsh and Detective Bradley investigate Sean's murder and discover evidence that Sean was running drugs for dealer Big Cheese.

Determined to solve Sean's murder, Astrid,  Sean's ex-girlfriend, asks Perfect Pizza owner Jack for her old job back. Jack sends out Astrid along with other Perfect Pizza employees Thomas "Scooter" Martinez, Heather, and Joe, the latter of whom is a ghost. Sadie's research into the murder case leads her to a previous string of murders when the Perfect Pizza Place used to be Yummy Yummy Chinese Cuisine. The prime suspect in those murders was deliveryman Dax Lycander, a werewolf who disappeared, but was recently seen riding his moped around Kingfisher.

Astrid shirks her job duties to confront Big Cheese over Sean's murder. Astrid puts a knife to Big Cheese's throat, but flees when the police arrive. Detective Marsh and Detective Bradley take Big Cheese in for questioning, who implies that Dax Lycander is back. Meanwhile, Scooter is killed while making a delivery, and Dax is spotted at the scene of the crime. Vera and Debbie visit Mayor Tracy to demand he tear down the Perfect Pizza building to prevent vengeful ghosts from killing again. It is revealed that Justice 40,000 and Mayor Tracy are actually in a joint conspiracy to build public support for the site's demolition in order to resell the property.

Sadie visits Perfect Pizza to tell Jack, Astrid, and Joe about Dax Lycander and the previous deliveryman murders, but is ignored. Meanwhile, Vera and Debbie secretly welcome Heather as the newest conspirator. Marsh and Bradley chase down Dax. During a junkyard chase in which Dax saves Bradley's life, Marsh arrests Dax. Dax professes his innocence during questioning and escapes police custody. Astrid tracks down Sean's ghost but is disappointed to learn that Sean is still a drug addict who has not changed his ways. Astrid is stabbed from behind and becomes a ghost.

Sadie uncovers that Vera's group is actually a coven of witches that are responsible for the deliveryman murders. Sadie brings her discovery to Detective Marsh, but Marsh stubbornly insists that Dax is still the prime suspect due to his hatred of werewolves. Mayor Tracy publicly proclaims that the murders are not the result of a ghost conspiracy, which upsets the coven's cover story. Vera later attacks and kills Mayor Tracy in his office. Meanwhile, Joe notices Heather behaving strangely when she goes down to the Perfect Pizza basement. Dax abducts Sadie to find out what she knows. Sadie suggests that Dax should kill Vera, but Dax insists he isn't a murderous werewolf. Sadie returns to Jack to tell him that she believes the coven targeted the Chinese restaurant and Perfect Pizza because of the location. Sadie, Joe, and Jack investigate the building's basement and meet the ghost of janitor Carl, who reveals the building was built on a portal to hell, and the coven plans on using the portal to make a slave army using ghosts.

Mayor Tracy holds a press conference to publicly reveal the witch coven conspiracy, but Vera interrupts him to show everyone that Mayor Tracy is now a ghost. The coven assembles to emit a green energy blast over Kingfisher. This results in a chaotic spree of ghosts haunting humans. Now a vigilante assassin, Astrid kills several coven members. Dax turns down Astrid's request to partner with her to kill Vera, but Detective Bradley later changes his mind. Vera and Heather send Debbie into Perfect Pizza. Thinking he can protect the portal by sacrificing himself, Jack blows up Perfect Pizza. However, this opens up the portal instead of destroying it. Astrid arrives outside to battle Vera and Heather. Dax turns into a werewolf to rescue Astrid. Detective Marsh arrives in time to shoot Vera dead while Detective Bradley arrests Heather, closing the portal.

Now a ghost, Jack re-opens his parlor in a new location as Jack's Perfect Pizza, with Astrid, Dax, Scooter, Joe and Carl as employees. Sadie becomes a television news reporter.

Cast

 Zazie Beetz as Astrid, an employee at Perfect Pizza Base.
 Chance Bennett as Dax Lycander, a werewolf and former deliveryman.
 Rae Gray as Sadie Sheridan, a young journalist for the Kingfisher Chronicle.
 Marilyn Dodds Frank as Vera Marcus, the leader of Justice 40,000.
 Katherine Cunningham as Heather, an employee at Perfect Pizza Base.
 Will Brill as Bradley, a police detective investigating Sean's murder and Marsh's partner.
 Y'lan Noel as Big Cheese, a drug dealer.
 Hannibal Buress as Hannibal, an employee at Magic Mountain Diner.
 Lakin Valdez as Joe, a ghost and employee at Perfect Pizza Base.
 Rudy Galvan as Thomas "Scooter" Martinez, an employee at Perfect Pizza Base.
 Tim Decker as Steve Marsh, a police detective investigating Sean's murder and Bradley's partner.
 Kelli Simpkins as Debbie Saluski, Vera's right-hand woman.
 Joe Keery as Jackson, a friend of Sadie's and the photographer for the Kingfisher Chronicle.
 Elijah Alvarado as Tweaker
 Chris Parnell as Mayor Tracy, the corrupt mayor of Kingfisher.
 Paul Scheer as Jack, the manager of Perfect Pizza Base.
 Rebecca Spence as Cheryl
 Gary Houston as Lennox, Bradley and Marsh's superior officer.
 Austin Vesely as Sean Hammerschmit, an employee at Perfect Pizza Base.
 David Ruhe as Ghost and Reporter.

Production
In July 2015, it was announced Chance the Rapper had been cast in the film, with Austin Vesely directing from a screenplay he wrote. In October 2016, it was announced A24 would distribute the film. It was later revealed Zazie Beetz, Joe Keery, and Paul Scheer had joined the cast of the film.

Principal photography began on August 20, 2016, in Joliet, Illinois.

Marketing
On October 31, 2017, a teaser trailer was released, confirming a 2018 release. On August 6, 2018, a teaser poster parodying the logo of pizza chain Little Caesars was revealed. This was followed by a Domino's Pizza-themed teaser poster released on August 9, as well as a Pizza Hut-themed poster released on August 15. An official trailer for the film was uploaded to YouTube on August 21, 2018.

Release
The film was released on September 10, 2018. It had a video on demand release the next day. It was released on DVD in the United States on January 29, 2019.

Reception
On Metacritic, the film has a weighted average score of 61 out of 100, based on 7 critics, indicating "generally favorable reviews".

Richard Roeper gave the film three stars saying "Slice is schlock, but that’s kind of the point...But it has originality, and originality goes a long way." Jamie Righetti of IndieWire gave the film a B+ and called it "a black comedy with horror elements that seems destined to become a stoner classic."

References

External links
 

2018 films
2018 horror films
2018 independent films
American comedy horror films
American slasher films
2010s slasher films
Slasher comedy films
A24 (company) films
Films scored by Ludwig Göransson
Parodies of horror
2018 directorial debut films
2010s English-language films
2010s American films